Chionodes bicolor is a moth in the family Gelechiidae. It is found in North America, where it has been recorded from California and Nevada.

References

Chionodes
Moths described in 1947
Moths of North America